The Turumbu people (also Lombo, Olombo, Ulumbu) live in the Democratic Republic of the Congo, mostly in the Isangi Territory  of the Tshopo District on both sides of the Congo River. They speak the Lombo language. As of 1971 their population was estimated to be 10,000.
A more recent estimate put the population at 32,000.

Location

The Turumbu territory lies in the Zairian Basin, an ecologically rich region with a wide variety of plants, animals and microorganisms. There are two rainy seasons, one between March and May and the other between August and November. The soil is infertile, forcing farmers to slash and burn new plots each growing season.

Economy

The farmers grow rice and maize as cash crops, and grow cassava and plantain for subsistence. They also hunt, fish and gather protein-based foods, manufacture alcoholic beverages and handicrafts and engage in petty trade.
There are foreign-owned plantations in the region growing coffee, cocoa, rubber and palm oil, but these are shrinking. There is little interaction between the smallholders and the plantation workers.

Most of the Turumbu villages are within reach of the Congo River and the Isangi - Yangambi - Kisangani road.
This road is unpaved, rarely used in the rainy season and difficult to use at all times of the year.
Lokele traders travelling by canoe on the river distribute and market farm and non-farm products of the Turumbu.

Culture

Almost all the Turumbu people practice Christianity.

References

Sources

Ethnic groups in the Democratic Republic of the Congo
Tshopo